The Dark Side of Life: Mumbai City is an Indian drama film released on 23 November 2018. The film is written and directed by Tariq Khan and is produced by Rajesh Pardasani under the banner of Lakshya Productions. The film marks the acting debut of veteran filmmaker Mahesh Bhatt who stars alongside actor Kay Kay Menon in the film.

Plot
The Dark Side of Life: Mumbai City is a multi-plotted story which revolves around the lives of six individuals who are pushed to the brink of depression while battling their emotional and financial problems.

Cast 
 Mahesh Bhatt as Zulfiqar Hussain
 Kay Kay Menon as Sumit Balsaria
 Neha Khan as Kavya
 Alisha Khan as Zohra
 Avii pardasni as Prince
 Deepraj Rana as Warrren Lobo
 Nikhil Ratnaparkhi as Anand
 Jyoti Malshe as Parul
 Gul Hameed as Kadambari

Production
The official shoot for the movie began in 2015. The poster was released on 31 August 2018, followed by the trailer launch on 11 September 2018.

Soundtrack  

The Film's Soundtrack was produced by various artists, The film had 6 Originals Soundtracks, The theme of the film Aawargi was sung by Jubin Nautiyal and composed by Sabir Khan
and the lyrics were helmed by Azeem Shirazi. Other songs include, 'Tu Mujhse Nilkalta Nahi', 'Ae Zindagi, Muddaton', 'Saanp Seedi Wala Saanp (Promotional Song)' and 'Aawargi Deewangi' 
The album received a mainly-positive response from critics, especially the song Aawargi was appreciated.

References

External links
 The Dark Side Of Life: Mumbai City on Bollywood Hungama
 

2018 films
Indian drama films
2010s Hindi-language films
2018 drama films
Hindi-language drama films